True Believer is a 2005 romance novel written by American author Nicholas Sparks.

Plot 

Pursuing a scientific explanation for a disturbing phenomenon, Jeremy's skeptical nature is thrown off course when he meets Lexie, the town librarian. As they work together, ghostly occurrences and passionate moments converge, forcing Jeremy to realize that there are some truths science cannot explain, as he finally appreciates the pleasure of exploring the heart.

2005 American novels
Novels by Nicholas Sparks
American romance novels